Kuloy is a rural locality (a village) in Pinezhskoye Rural Settlement of Pinezhsky District, Arkhangelsk Oblast, Russia. The population was 14 as of 2010.

Geography 
Kuloy is located on the Kuloy River, 166 km north of Karpogory (the district's administrative centre) by road. Krasny Bor is the nearest rural locality.

References 

Rural localities in Pinezhsky District